Israel competed at the AFC Asian Cup four times. In 1956 and 1960 Israel finished second, in 1964 they finished first, and in 1968 they finished third. In 1972 Israel qualified for the tournament as hosts but later withdrew.

Israel was expelled from the AFC in the early 1970s and eventually became a member of UEFA. After joining the UEFA Israel began competing in the UEFA European Championship in 1996.

Record

Red border color indicates tournament was held on home soil.

1956 AFC Asian Cup
Israel competed at the 1956 AFC Asian Cup. This was the first AFC Asian Cup and Israel’s first appearance.

With four goals, Nahum Stelmach is the top scorer in the tournament.
4 goals
 Nahum Stelmach

2 goals
 Yehoshua Glazer

Head coach:  Jackie Gibbons

1960 AFC Asian Cup
Israel competed at the 1960 AFC Asian Cup. This was the second AFC Asian Cup and Israel’s second appearance.

Qualification – Western Zone

Tournament results

Goal scorers
2 goals
 Shlomo Levi 
1 goal
 Amnon Aharonskind 
 Rafi Levi
 Avraham Menchel
 Nahum Stelmach

Squad

Head coach:  Gyula Mándi

1964 AFC Asian Cup
Israel competed at the 1964 AFC Asian Cup. This was the third AFC Asian Cup and Israel’s third appearance.

Host nation
The tournament used a round-robin system with the winners from the West, Central 1 and 2 and East Asia zones and the team from the host nation (Israel) competing for the title. 11 of the 16 nations withdrew including Iran and Japan with the result that only one zone (combined Central 1 and 2) played any qualifying matches and the 'winners' of 2 zones and host Israel qualified uncontested. In this diminished competition Israel won the title with three wins.

Venues

Qualification
Israel as the host nation automatically qualified for the tournament.

Tournament results

Goal scorers
2 goals
 Mordechai Spiegler

1 goal
 Yohai Aharoni
 Moshe Leon 
 Gideon Tish

Squad

Head coach:  Yosef Merimovich

1968 AFC Asian Cup
Israel competed at the 1968 AFC Asian Cup. This was the fourth AFC Asian Cup and Israel’s fourth and last appearance.

After the 1968 tournament Israel did not compete in a regional football tournament for many years. Israel was expelled from the AFC in the early 1970s and eventually became a member of UEFA. After joining the UEFA Israel began competing in the UEFA European Championship in 1996.

Qualification – West Zone 1
Israel qualified for the tournament by default after all other teams in their zone withdrew from the tournament.

Tournament results

Goal scorers
With 4 goals, Giora Spiegel and Moshe Romano of Israel tied with Homayoun Behzadi of Iran as the top scorers of the tournament.

4 goals
 Giora Spiegel
 Moshe Romano

2 goals 
 Mordechai Spiegler

1 goal 
 Shmuel Rosenthal

Squad

Head coach:  Milovan Ćirić

See also
AFC Asian Cup qualifiers#All-time table

References

 
Countries at the AFC Asian Cup